In Greek mythology, Andropompus (Ancient Greek: Ανδρόχόμχος) was one of the descendants of Neleus, king of Thessaly, as son of Penthilus and Anchirhoe. He was the father of King Melanthus of Athens.

See also
 Borus
 Lebedus
 Seferihisar
 Xanthus

References

External links 
 Thomas Falconer - Chronological tables: beginning with the reign of Solomon, and ending with the death of Alexander the Great. With a prefatory discourse (Google eBook)  1796 retrieved 08:40 11.10.11

Year of birth unknown
Year of death unknown
Greek mythological heroes